The orange-fronted hanging parrot or Papuan hanging parrot (Loriculus aurantiifrons) is a small species of parrot in the family Psittaculidae.
It is endemic to forest in New Guinea and adjacent smaller islands. It sometimes includes the Bismarck hanging parrot as a subspecies.

Description 
Individuals are 10 cm (4 in) and 14-16 g, and sexually dimorphic. Males and females are both mainly green in color, with males having a golden yellow forecrown, and females having a blue-green forecrown and blue-green cheeks. Both genders have a red throat patch, red rump, and yellow on the sides of the rump.

References

External links
World Parrot Trust Parrot Encyclopedia - Species Profiles

orange-fronted hanging parrot
Birds of New Guinea
orange-fronted hanging parrot
Taxonomy articles created by Polbot